Stoney End is a compilation album of folk rock music by Linda Ronstadt and The Stone Poneys. It was released in 1972 by Pickwick Records in the U.S. and Canada.

The recording
The album was released on vinyl, cassette and 8-track. The nine songs on the album feature Ronstadt, a major star by the time of its release, on lead vocals; and are taken from the Stone Poneys' second and third albums, Evergreen, Volume 2 and Linda Ronstadt, Stone Poneys and Friends, Vol. III, from 1967 and 1968, respectively. The material was licensed by Pickwick from Capitol Records.

Track listing

Side 1
 "Wings" (Tim Buckley) – 2:57
 "Different Drum" (Mike Nesmith) – 2:38
 "Some of Shelly's Blues" (Mike Nesmith) – 2:11
 "Driftin'" (K. Edwards/B. Kimmel) – 2:30
 "Stoney End" (Laura Nyro) – 2:40

Side 2
 "December Dream" (John Braheny) – 3:25
 "Hobo" (Tim Buckley) – 3:04
 "One For One" (Al Silverman/Austin DeLone) – 2:50
 "Let's Get Together" (Dino Valenti) – 3:10

Notes

References

Stone Poneys albums
Folk rock compilation albums
Linda Ronstadt compilation albums
1972 albums